The Hyundai Kia R&D Museum was opened in . It is located in Hyundai Kia R&D center, Hwaseong Gyeonggi, South Korea. It displays significant cars from Hyundai Motors and Kia Motors. It has 20 cars on display, and 190 cars in storage due to storage considerations. It displays some remarkable cars such as  Hyundai Pony, Hyundai Stellar, Kia Bongo, Kia Sephia,  Kia Elan, Hyundai Porter and  Hyundai Accent. Hyundai Motors is still looking for its previous models, such as Ford Cortina, which was Hyundai's first production car. Hyundai is planning to make Hyundai Motor Museum which is scheduled to open in 2016. The museum will be constructed by Hyundai Construction.

Visiting
To visit the museum, one must be invited by Hyundai Motor Group or be an employee who works for the group. Visits are limited to small groups, and, because the museum is located at the R&D center, there are limitations on photography.

Other museums
Hyundai and Kia Motors also own the other museum. It is located in the factory complex for visitors to take a look at the history of the company. The rest of the South Korean Motor companies like GM Korea and SsangYong Motor Company does not collect or have their museums. The "R&D Museum" is one of the two automaker-owned museums in South Korea; the other being the Renault Samsung Motors Gallery, which was established in 1998.

References

External links
 Hyundai R&D Museum
 Kia Elan (Lotus Elan) in museum

Museums in Gyeonggi Province
Hyundai Motor Company
2007 establishments in South Korea
Automotive museums
Museums established in 2007
Transport museums in South Korea